Lulu Ranne (born 12 July 1971 in Kristinestad) is a Finnish politician currently serving in the Parliament of Finland for the Finns Party at the Tavastia constituency.

Early life
Ranne moved to Haparanda, Sweden, when she was six years old and lived there until she was eighteen. She speaks both Finnish and Swedish.

References

1971 births
Living people
People from Kristinestad
Finns Party politicians
Members of the Parliament of Finland (2019–23)
21st-century Finnish women politicians
Women members of the Parliament of Finland
Finnish emigrants to Sweden